The Brighton Beach Range Lights are a set of range lights in Charlottetown,  Prince Edward Island, Canada. They were built in 1890, and are still active.

See also
 List of lighthouses in Prince Edward Island
 List of lighthouses in Canada

References

External links
 Aids to Navigation Canadian Coast Guard

Lighthouses in Prince Edward Island
Lighthouses completed in 1890
Buildings and structures in Charlottetown